St. Michael the Archangel Parish - designated for Polish immigrants in Haverhill, Massachusetts, United States.

 Founded  January 13, 1901. It was one of the Polish-American Roman Catholic parishes in New England in the Archdiocese of Boston.

Parish closed on August 29, 1998.

Bibliography 
 
 Our Lady of Czestochowa Parish - Centennial 1893-1993
 The Official Catholic Directory in USA

External links 

 Roman Catholic Archdiocese of Boston
 Closed and Merged Parishes

Roman Catholic parishes of Archdiocese of Boston
Polish-American Roman Catholic parishes in Massachusetts
Buildings and structures in Haverhill, Massachusetts
Churches in Essex County, Massachusetts
Churches completed in 1931